Mladen Vitković (born 22 March 1990) is a Serbian professional basketball player for Mladost SP of the Basketball League of Serbia. He started his career in 2012 with OKK Konstantin.

References

External links
Mladen Vitković at proballers.com
Mladen Vitković at Basketballleague.nl
Mladen Vitković at RealGM

1990 births
Living people
Apollo Amsterdam players
Dutch Basketball League players
Basketball League of Serbia players
OKK Konstantin players
KK Mladost SP players
KK Tamiš players
KK Kolubara players
Power forwards (basketball)
Serbian expatriate basketball people in Bulgaria
Serbian expatriate basketball people in the Netherlands
Serbian men's basketball players
Basketball players from Niš